Jørgen Fredrik Spørck (1787–1866) was a Norwegian military officer and politician.

As a politician,  mayor in Stryn from 1842 to 1843. He was also a deputy representative to the Norwegian Parliament.

References

1787 births
1866 deaths
Deputy members of the Storting
Mayors of places in Sogn og Fjordane
Norwegian Army personnel
People from Stryn